Wedding banquet may refer to:
 The Wedding Banquet, a 1993 Taiwanese-American film
 the actual banquet (meal) at a wedding. This may include:
 rehearsal dinner, a pre-wedding ceremony in North American tradition
 wedding breakfast, in English Sex tradition
 wedding reception, a party held after the completion of a marriage ceremony